Josephine and Men is a 1955 British  comedy film directed by Roy Boulting and starring Glynis Johns, Jack Buchanan, Donald Sinden and Peter Finch.  It also features William Hartnell, Gerald Sim, Thorley Walters, Victor Maddern and John Le Mesurier in supporting roles. Produced by the Boulting Brothers it was shot at Shepperton Studios and distributed by British Lion Films.

Plot
Josephine's (Glynis Johns) story is told in flashback by her suave bachelor uncle (Jack Buchanan). We hear how she rejects her wealthy fiancé Alan (Donald Sinden)(who owns a Bristol 405 car) for his friend David (Peter Finch), an unsuccessful playwright. But when their situations are reversed, Josephine's interest in David starts to wane. She is a woman we hear, always drawn to underdogs.

Mr Charles Luton (Jack Buchanan) is living in a hotel and on good terms with the receptionist and barman. He tells them of his problem with women. He then starts explaining his niece, Josephine... he describes her moral campaigning as being a "one-woman Salvation Army".

Josephine introduces her fiancee, Alan Hartley (Donald Sinden), to the uncle over dinner. All three go to visit "whats-his-name" (Peter Finch) in a run down tenement. He lives on the top floor and a half-dressed Italian girl storms off as they arrive. "Whats-his-name", David Hewer, an unemployed playwright, is living in squalor. Josephine offers to wash the big pile of dishes. His attic flat has a rooftop view over other houses to two gasometers in the mid-distance... which although seen as a romantic view would then be seen as undesirable. Josephine leaves her gloves so she has an excuse to return alone. She tidies a bit and leaves, almost forgetting her gloves. They shake hands.

Back at Josephine's parents house, Alan, Josephine and her parents inspect the wedding presents. The parents look down upon the electroplated silver tray, as an inferior gift. However, Josephine tells Alan she wants to break off the engagement and marry David Hewer... but he does not know yet. Josephine makes it clear that she must marry the person who needs her most i.e. the underdog.

David and Josephine marry at a registry office on Friday 13 April. The Italian girl and the Bohemian living in David's tenement act as witnesses. Alan forgives them both and sends a silver Georgian teapot as a wedding gift.

David writes two successful comedies: "Love on a Crust" and "Hard Cheese". Meanwhile Alan concentrates on his professional life and becomes hugely successful.

Jo and David move to a remote country cottage. Uncle Charlie comes to visit (with quite a lot of luggage).

The police arrive at Alan Hartley's house looking to arrest him for obtaining money by deception. Although this does not appear to be his own fault, he flees. He runs to David and Jo arriving in heavy rain having walked 15 miles. Alan is invited to stay but David starts to become paranoid that he will be discovered there and they might all be arrested. Jo starts to gravitate towards Alan as his "need" is greater.

The police arrive at the cottage and ask questions about Hartley. Uncle Charlie and David answer all questions truthfully but in a tactful way to avoid giving any useful information. Uncle Charles says he saw Alan "recently" .... at his club two years ago.

Alan discusses his plan to escape to South America with Jo. Uncle Charles returns to find Jo and Alan kissing in the cottage.

David gets fed up with it all and goes to the pub. Uncle Charles joins him later, but David rushes off after making a phone call.

Jo and Alan are stopped by police while driving. He gives himself up and at the station discovers that his partner left a note taking full blame. Jo instantly realises she is not needed by him and she must return to David. At home Uncle Charlie gets her to rewrite her goodbye note.

Cast

 Glynis Johns as Josephine ("Jo") Luton
 Jack Buchanan as Uncle Charles Luton
 Donald Sinden as Alan Hartley
 Peter Finch as David Hewer
 Heather Thatcher as Aunt May Luton
 Ronald Squire as Frederick Luton, Josephine's father
 William Hartnell as Inspector Parsons
 Victor Maddern as Henry
 Gerald Sim as Detective Sergeant Allen
 Hugh Moxey as Police Inspector
 Sam Kydd as Police Sergeant
 Tonie MacMillan as Mrs. McFee
 Wally Patch as pub landlord
 Peggy Ann Clifford as barmaid
 Thorley Walters as vacuum cleaner salesman
 Laurence Naismith as Porter
 John Le Mesurier as Registrar
 Lisa Gastoni as Italian Girl
 Michael Ward as Bohemian, living in Hewer's tenement
 Edward Cast as Motorcycle Policeman 
 Jacques Cey as André 
 Harold Goodwin as Garage Mechanic

Critical reception
Britmovie wrote, "the lightweight and stagey story is framed in flashback by the debonair Jack Buchanan’s narration but fails to exude any humour or convincing romance." while the Radio Times concluded, "not as funny as it could have been, but the cast is likeable."

References

External links

1955 films
1955 comedy films
1950s English-language films
Films directed by Roy Boulting
British comedy films
Films with screenplays by Nigel Balchin
Films shot at Shepperton Studios
British Lion Films films
Films set in London
1950s British films